"Open Arms" is a song by American recording artist Tina Turner. It was written by Colette van Sertima, Ben Barson, and former Kane Gang member Martin Brammer and produced by Jimmy Hogarth for her compilation album All the Best (2004). The track features backing vocals from KT Tunstall and Estelle.

Released as the album's lead single towards the end of 2004, it became a top 40 success on most of the charts it appeared on, reaching the top five in Belgium and Hungary and the top 30 in Italy and the United Kingdom. In the US, "Open Arms" peaked at number 15 on the Billboard Adult Contemporary chart.

Track listing and formats
European CD single
 "Open Arms" – 4:03
 "The Best" (Edit) – 4:09

European CD maxi single
 "Open Arms" – 4:03
 "Great Spirits" – 3:57
 "Cose della vita - Can't Stop Thinking of You" (with Eros Ramazzotti) – 3:43
 "Open Arms" (Enhanced Interview Footage)

Charts

Weekly charts

Year-end charts

References

External links
 

2004 singles
Tina Turner songs
Songs written by Martin Brammer
2004 songs
Parlophone singles